The Tangshan–Caofeidian railway is a railway line in China. The railway connects Tangshan to the ports at Caofeidian.

History
Construction of the railway began in 2015. It opened on 30 June 2018.

A passenger service between Tangshan and Caofeidian East was introduced on 28 December 2018.

References

Railway lines in China
Railway lines opened in 2018